"Land of the Great Horses" is a short story by R. A. Lafferty from Harlan Ellison's science fiction anthology Dangerous Visions.  The story takes a broad view of the earth after extraterrestrials (the Outer Visitors) return the native land of the Romany (the Land of the Great Horses), on which they had been experimenting. Roma everywhere leave their work to return to it.

They then scoop up the city of Los Angeles, whose residents become the new wanderers, Angelenos. When asked what happened, they commonly reply, "They came and took our Dizz away from us."

Publication history
Dangerous Visions, ed. Harlan Ellison, Garden City, NY: Doubleday 1967 pp427–437
Nine Hundred Grandmothers (1970) R. A. Lafferty
So frustrieren wir Karl den Grossen: erzählungen, Heyne BSF, v89

Translations
 Czech – Kraj velkých koní, Světová literatura (World Literature) bi-monthly 1982/4
 Dutch – Het Land van de Grote Paarden (1971)
 Finnish – Suurten hevosten maa, Portti (4/1982)
 French – La terre des grands chevaux (1975)
 German – Heimkehr der Heimatlosen ("Homesickness of the Homeless", 1970)
 German – Land der grossen Pferde (1974)
 German – Das Land der großen Pferde (1997)
 Italian - Terra Dei Grandi Cavalli (1980)
 Japanese - 巨馬の国 (1981)
 Polish - Kraina wielkich koni, Foreign Literature monthly (1/1976)
 Romanian - Ținutul cailor măreți (2013)

References

External links
 

1967 short stories
Science fiction short stories
Dangerous Visions short stories